Carpe noctem is a Latin phrase meaning "seize the night".

Carpe noctem may also refer to:

 Carpe Noctem (Angel), an episode of the television show Angel
 Carpe Noctem magazine, a popular 1990s print publication covering the goth subculture
 Carpe Noctem, name of the goth themed nightclub in season 1 episode 11 of Lost Girl
 Carpe Noctem, a live album released by Armored Saint in 2015
 Carpe Noctem, an album released by Big Ghost in 2020
 “Carpe Noctem”, a song off the single “Bliss (Episode 3)” and later the album “Bliss” both released in 2022 by Texas-based band “Aberdeen”

See also
 Seize the Night (novel), a 1998 novel by Dean Koontz 
 Carpe diem (disambiguation)